The Predators are an Australian rock band formed in Brisbane, Queensland in 2005. The band comprises three of the original members of successful rock group Powderfinger, Steven Bishop, Ian Haug and John Collins and Haug's fellow member of Far Out Corporation, Ross McLennan.

History
Early in Powderfinger's days, Bishop left the group for personal reasons while Haug and Collins stayed on. Haug joined collaborative group Far Out Corporation in the late 1990s with Grant McLennan and drummer Ross McLennan. 

In 2004, Powderfinger decided to go on hiatus and Haug and Collins both decided to begin families. During this time, they reconnected with Bishop, started playing together and decided to write some music. Before long the group had named themselves The Predators and were signed to Dew Process, a label begun by Powderfinger's manager Paul Piticco which released records by other Powderfinger side projects as well. The Predators recorded their debut EP Pick Up the Pace for the label and it was released in July 2006. For live shows they were joined by Ross McLennan on drums to enable Bishop to concentrate on singing.

In late 2006, Powderfinger reunited, leaving all side projects on hiatus to focus on their new album Dream Days at the Hotel Existence, which was released in June 2007 and debuted at #1 on the ARIA Albums Chart.

Discography
2006: Pick Up the Pace (EP)

Personnel
Ian Haug - Guitars and backing vocals
John Collins - Bass guitars
Steven Bishop - Vocals and studio drums
Ross McLennan - Live drums

External links
The Predators' MySpace

Australian rock music groups
Musical groups from Brisbane
Musical groups established in 2005